Sorolopha leptochlora is a species of moth of the family Tortricidae. It is found in Australia, where it has been recorded from Queensland.

The wingspan is about 12 mm. The forewings are fuscous with a small crest of scales on the dorsum with a green costal edge, strigulated (finely streaked) with fuscous. The apical portion of the wing is whitish, with greenish and fuscous scales. The hindwings are fuscous, thinly scaled towards the base.

References

Moths described in 1863
Olethreutini
Moths of Australia